Tony Williams (Anthony David Henry Williams) is a British poet and novelist, and an academic teacher of creative writing. His work has received a number of awards.

Bibliography

PhD

 "Contemporary Pastoral: Sean O Brien, Peter Didsbury, Michael Hofmann; and Original Poetry Collection" (Sheffield Hallam University, 2009),

Poetry

 Williams, Tony (2014) The Midlands. Nine Arches Press, Rugby. 
 Williams, Tony (2011) All the Rooms of Uncle's Head. Nine Arches Press, Rugby. . Poetry Book Society's Pamphlet Choice for Winter 2011.
 Williams, Tony (2009) The Corner of Arundel Lane and Charles Street. Salt Publishing, London. . Shortlisted for the Aldeburgh First Collection Prize, the Portico Prize for Literature and the Michael Murphy Memorial Prize.

Short stories

 Williams, Tony (2012) All the Bananas I've Never Eaten: Tales of Love and Loneliness. Salt Publishing, Norfolk, UK. . Best Short Story Collection in the 2013 Saboteur Awards.

Novels

 Williams, Tony (2017) Nutcase. Salt Publishing, London.

References

External links
 Williams's blog

21st-century British novelists
21st-century British poets
Academics of Northumbria University
Living people
Place of birth missing (living people)
Year of birth missing (living people)